The Humane Slaughter Act,  or the Humane Methods of Livestock Slaughter Act (P.L. 85-765; 7 U.S.C. 1901 et seq.), is a United States federal law designed to decrease suffering of livestock during slaughter.  It was approved on August 27, 1958. The most notable of these requirements is the need to have an animal completely sedated and insensible to pain. This is to minimize the suffering to the point where the animal feels nothing at all, instead blacking out and never waking. This differs from animal to animal as size increases and decreases. Larger animals such as bovines require a stronger method than chickens, for example. Bovines require electronarcosis or something equally potent, though electronarcosis remains a standard. The bovine would have a device placed on their head that, once activated, sends an electric charge that efficiently and safely stuns them. Chickens, on the other hand, require much less current to be efficiently sedated and are given a run under electrically charged water. To ensure that these guidelines are met, The Food Safety and Inspection Service inspectors at slaughtering plants are responsible for overseeing compliance, and have the authority to stop slaughter lines and order plant employees to take corrective actions. Although more than 168 million chickens (excluding broilers) and around 9 billion broiler chickens are killed for food in the United States yearly, the Humane Slaughter Act specifically mentions only cattle, calves, horses, mules, sheep and swine.

Due to several reports of alleged non-compliance with these regulations and safety protocols, originating in the early 2000s, specifically late 2002 , FSIS assigned additional veterinarians to its district offices specifically to monitor slaughter and handling procedures and to report to their headquarters about any issues of compliance. This has been the case ever since, as Congress passed a bill in 2002, The 2002 farm bill, that requires a compliance report to be submitted annually. In 2003, the initiative increased further as, in the FY in 2003, Congress voted in another $5 million operation to the FSIS effort and increased the amount of compliance inspectors by 50. Language in the FY 2004 consolidated appropriations act directs FSIS to continue fulfilling that mandate, and the FY2005 budget request calls for another $5 million to be allocated for enforcement activities. Despite these requirements in place, reports from January 2004 GAO have noted that there is still alleged non-compliance. These were narrowed down to select states that issues of non-compliance still allegedly persist (GAO-04-247).  Earlier concerns about humane treatment of non-ambulatory (downer) cattle at slaughter houses became irrelevant  when FSIS issued regulations in January 2004 (69 FR 1892) prohibiting them from being slaughtered and inspected for use as human food.

Content of the Humane Slaughter Act

According to the law, animals should be stunned into unconsciousness prior to their slaughter to ensure a death with less suffering than in killing methods used earlier.  The most common methods are electrocution and CO2 stunning for swine and captive bolt stunning for cattle, sheep, and goats. Of these methods of electrocution, electronarcosis has been widely acclaimed as the safest, most humane and most reliable as well as the surest way to stun the animal and render them insensitive to pain. Organizations such as the Egyptian Fatwa Committee have mutually agreed to this method when of keeping the standards of halal a concern. Electronarcosis does not infringe on these standards for halal. Frequent on-site monitoring is necessary, as is the employment of skilled and well-trained personnel.  An animal is considered properly stunned when there is no "righting reflex"; that is, the animal must not try to stand up and right themself.  Only then can they be considered fully unconscious.  They can then proceed down the line, where workers in slaughterhouses can begin the slaughtering of the specified livestock humanely.

For religious sects to proceed in the slaughtering of animals under specifically related rituals, they must fall within compliance of the previously mentioned criterion. No religion is exempt. Many religions find these regulations to fall within their own guidelines as appropriate. The two most common religious slaughter methods in the United States are the method of kosher, of the Jewish faith and the method of halal, of the Muslim faith. While all require that the animal be killed through ritual slaughter, proponents of certain religious-based slaughter methods claim that the severing of the animal's carotid arteries, jugular veins and vagus nerve renders the animal unconscious as effectively as most other methods. In 2018, Grandin stated that kosher slaughter, no matter how well it's done, is not instantaneous, whereas stunning properly with a captive bolt is instantaneous.

History of the Humane Slaughter Act

1958
The first version of the HMSLA was passed in 1958.  Public demand for the act was so great that when asked at a press conference whether he would sign it, President Dwight D. Eisenhower stated, "If I went by mail, I'd think no one was interested in anything but humane slaughter."
Senator Hubert H. Humphrey was the author of the first humane slaughter bill introduced in the US Congress and chief Senate sponsor of the Federal Humane Slaughter Act, which passed in 1958.  National organizations like the Animal Welfare Institute and The Humane Society of the United States supported its passage.

1978
In 1979, the HMSLA was updated and United States Department of Agriculture (USDA) inspectors were given the authority to stop the slaughtering line when cruelty was observed. Officially, slaughtering was not to continue until said cruelty, whether as a result of equipment or of abuses by personnel, was corrected. However, the USDA eventually stopped authorizing USDA inspectors to stop the line, since doing so incurs considerable cost of time for the industry.

2002
On May 13, 2002, President George W. Bush signed the Farm Bill (Public Law 107-171) into law which contains an amendment (section 10305) stating that it was "the sense of Congress that the Secretary of Agriculture should fully enforce" the Humane Slaughter Act.

When introducing the Resolution on the Senate floor, Senator Peter Fitzgerald said:

Amendments to 1958 Act
U.S. Congressional amendments and legislative authority pertaining to the Humane Slaughter Act of 1958.

Criticism of the HMSLA

Exclusionary policies
The HMSLA is criticized by animal rights advocates and the Humane Society of the United States for only including cattle, pigs, and sheep but not poultry, fish, rabbits or other animals routinely slaughtered for food. After a 2004 PETA undercover investigation that publicized abuse of chickens by employees of a West Virginia Pilgrim's Pride slaughterhouse that supplied chickens to KFC, PETA was joined by the Humane Society in calling for the Humane Slaughter Act to be expanded to include birds.

See also
 Humane Slaughter Association
 Animal law
 Factory farming
 Islamic ritual slaughter
 Veganism

References

External links
 2003 Report from the USDA
 

1958 in law
United States federal agriculture legislation
Meat processing in the United States
Animal welfare and rights legislation in the United States